International Workers' Unity – Fourth International is a Trotskyist international organisation. It has members in Latin America, Western Europe and the CIS, including Izquierda Socialista in Argentina, Unidad Socialista de Izquierda in Venezuela, Corrente Socialista dos Trabalhadores in Brazil and Movimiento pelo Socialismo in Portugal.

It was formed in 1995 by the merger of the Revolutionary International Current, consisting of a breakaway faction of the International Workers League (Fourth International) (LIT-CI); and the International League for the Reconstruction of the Fourth International. Both the LIT and UIT claim to stand in the political tradition of Nahuel Moreno.

Fusion talks with the Committee for a Workers' International were held in 1997, but quickly failed, some German CWI members joined the UIT in the process, creating a short-lived German section called Sozialistische Initiative/Sozialistische Liga (SI/SL).

See also 
 List of Trotskyist internationals

References

External links 
UIT-CI (in Spanish)